In the 1859 Iowa State Senate elections, Iowa voters elected state senators to serve in the eighth Iowa General Assembly. Following the expansion of the Iowa Senate from 36 to 43 seats in 1859, elections were held for 27 of the state senate's 43 seats. State senators serve four-year terms in the Iowa State Senate.

The general election took place in 1859.

Following the previous election in 1857, Republicans had control of the Iowa Senate with 22 seats to Democrats' 14 seats.

To claim control of the chamber from Republicans, the Democrats needed to net eight Senate seats.

Republicans maintained control of the Iowa State Senate following the election with the balance of power shifting to Republicans holding 22 seats and Democrats having 21 seats (a net gain of 7 seats for Democrats).

Summary of Results 
 Note: The holdover Senators not up for re-election are not listed on this table.

Source:

Detailed Results
NOTE: The Iowa General Assembly does not provide detailed vote totals for Iowa State Senate elections in 1859.

See also
 Elections in Iowa

External links
District boundaries were redrawn before the 1859 general election for the Iowa Senate:
Iowa Senate Districts 1856-1859 map
Iowa Senate Districts 1860-1861 map

References

Iowa Senate
Iowa
Iowa Senate elections